Bryukhovo is a rural locality (a selo) and the administrative center of Bryukhovskoye Rural Settlement, Yelovsky District, Perm Krai, Russia. The population was 377 as of 2010. There are 7 streets.

Geography 
Bryukhovo is located 29 km south of Yelovo (the district's administrative centre) by road. Prokhoryata is the nearest rural locality.

References 

Rural localities in Yelovsky District